Robert Jay Sigel (born November 13, 1943) is an American professional golfer. He enjoyed one of the more illustrious careers in the history of U.S. amateur golf, before turning pro in 1993 at age 50, when he became a member of the Senior PGA Tour, now known as the PGA Tour Champions.

Early years
Born and raised in Bryn Mawr, Pennsylvania, Sigel grew up playing golf at Aronimink Golf Club in Newtown Square, Pennsylvania. He attended high school at Lower Merion High School in Lower Merion, Pennsylvania. From there he moved on to Wake Forest University where he was a member of the golf team. He graduated with a degree in sociology in 1967.

Amateur career
Throughout the 1970s and 1980s, Sigel was one of America's premier amateur golfers. He compiled victories in the U.S. Amateur, British Amateur and U.S. Mid-Amateur, competed on nine Walker Cup teams, and won numerous other amateur titles. In 1975 he was ranked the #8 amateur in the USA by Golf Digest and the following year advanced to #4.

In 1983, he became the only golfer ever to win the U.S. Amateur and U.S. Mid-Amateur in the same year, which made him only the third golfer to win two USGA individual titles in the same year. He was also runner-up in the Canadian Amateur Championship that year. Although he remained an amateur he did occasionally compete in professional events on the PGA Tour. His best finish was tied 18th at the 1979 IVB-Philadelphia Golf Classic. He was the low amateur in the 1980 Open Championship, the 1984 U.S. Open, and the Masters Tournament in 1980, 1981, and 1988.

Business career and personal life 
Sigel was considering a professional golf career while in college, but injured his arm in an accident. He decided on a career in insurance, while competing in high-level amateur golf. Sigel developed his own successful insurance business in the Philadelphia area for over 30 years. He recently sold the business to Century Business Services, where he remains a Senior Vice President. He is a Chartered Life Underwriter, Chartered Financial Consultant and a qualifying life member of the Million Dollar Round Table. He also sits on the Corporate Advisory Board for the American Cancer Society, and is the president of the Greater Philadelphia Scholastic Golf Association and the First Tee of Philadelphia chapter. He hosts the Annual Jay Sigel Invitational Golf Tournament at his home course, Aronimink Golf Club. The proceeds from this tournament benefit prostate cancer research at the University of Pennsylvania. He has three daughters and currently resides in Berwyn, Pennsylvania with wife Betty.

Professional career
Sigel turned professional when he reached the age of 50. He joined the Senior PGA Tour in 1994 and won Rookie of the Year honors, when he earned 14 top-10 finishes and secured his first victory at the GTE West Classic. For the next five seasons, he finished in the top-31 on the Senior Tour money list. He won eight events; the last was the 2003 Bayer Advantage Celebrity Pro-Am. In the 2004 Champions Tour season, Sigel finished in the money in all 28 tournaments that he entered and had six top-10 finishes. During the 2005 campaign his best finish was 5th at the Turtle Bay Championship. He has career earnings of over $9 million. Since joining the Champions Tour in 1994, Sigel has been sponsored by Global Management Consulting and technology services company Accenture.

Amateur wins
this list may be incomplete
1961 International Jaycee Junior Golf Tournament
1962 Pennsylvania Amateur
1966 Pennsylvania Amateur
1968 Pennsylvania Amateur
1972 Pennsylvania Amateur
1973 Philadelphia Amateur, Pennsylvania Amateur
1974 Pennsylvania Amateur
1975 Pennsylvania Amateur, Porter Cup
1976 Pennsylvania Amateur, Sunnehanna Amateur
1978 Pennsylvania Amateur, Sunnehanna Amateur
1979 Pennsylvania Amateur, British Amateur
1981 Pennsylvania Amateur, Porter Cup
1982 U.S. Amateur
1983 U.S. Amateur, U.S. Mid-Amateur
1984 Northeast Amateur
1985 Northeast Amateur, U.S. Mid-Amateur
1987 Porter Cup, U.S. Mid-Amateur, Philadelphia Amateur
1988 Sunnehanna Amateur
1991 Northeast Amateur

Professional wins

Other wins (10)
this list may be incomplete
1974 Pennsylvania Open Championship
1975 Philadelphia Open Championship
1977 Philadelphia Open Championship
1978 Philadelphia Open Championship, Pennsylvania Open Championship
1980 Philadelphia Open Championship
1983 Pennsylvania Open Championship
1986 Philadelphia Open Championship
1987 Philadelphia Open Championship
1990 Pennsylvania Open Championship

all as an amateur

Champions Tour wins (8)

Champions Tour playoff record (2–2)

Other senior wins
1997 Diners Club Matches (with Gil Morgan)
2006 Georgia-Pacific Grand Champions Championship (unofficial Champions Tour event)

Results in major championships

Note: Sigel never played in the PGA Championship

LA = Low amateur
CUT = missed the half-way cut
"T" = tied

U.S. national team appearances
Amateur
Walker Cup: 1977 (winners), 1979 (winners), 1981 (winners), 1983 (winners, playing captain), 1985 (winners, playing captain), 1987 (winners), 1989, 1991 (winners), 1993 (winners)
Eisenhower Trophy: 1978 (winners), 1980 (winners), 1982 (winners), 1984, 1986, 1988, 1992

See also
List of people from Pennsylvania

References

External links

Sponsor biography
United States Golf Association profile
Charity Golf Tournament press release

American male golfers
Wake Forest Demon Deacons men's golfers
PGA Tour Champions golfers
Golfers from Pennsylvania
Lower Merion High School alumni
People from Bryn Mawr, Pennsylvania
1943 births
Living people